The Czech Republic women's national field hockey team represents the Czech Republic in international women's field hockey competitions.

Tournament record

EuroHockey Championship
1995 – 10th place
1999 – 12th place
2017 – 7th place

EuroHockey Championship II
2007 – 7th place
2015 – 
2019 – 6th place
2021 – 6th place

EuroHockey Championship III
2005 – 
2009 – 
2011 – 
2013 –

Hockey World League
2012–13 – 28th place
2014–15 – Round 1
2016–17 – 25th place

FIH Hockey Series
2018–19 – Second round

See also
Czech Republic men's national field hockey team

References

External links
Official website
FIH profile

European women's national field hockey teams
Field hockey
Women's field hockey in the Czech Republic